Jozo Izaija Matovac (born 22 May 1970) is a Swedish former professional footballer who played as defender. He represented BK Häcken, Örgryte IS, Aalborg BK, and Helsingborgs IF during a career that spanned between 1992 and 2002. A full international between 1997 and 2001, he won nine caps for the Sweden national team.

Club career
Matovac played youth football for Gunnilse IS before signing with BK Häcken. In 1995 he signed with Örgryte IS where he was considered one of Allsvenskan's best centre backs. He signed with the Danish Superliga club Aalborg BK in 1998, before returning to Swedish football in 2000 as a replacement at Helsingborgs IF for the departed Andreas Jakobsson. In 2000, Matovac helped the team qualify for the 2000–2001 UEFA Champions League in which he participated in all six group stage games. In 2002, he retired from professional football following a hip injury.

International career 
Matovac made his full international debut for Sweden on 9 February 1997 in a King's Cup game against Romania in which he also scored his first international goal as Sweden won 2–0. He made his competitive international debut for Sweden in a 1998 FIFA World Cup qualifier against Estonia, playing the full 90 minutes as centre back alongside Patrik Andersson as Sweden won 1–0. He won his ninth and final cap in a 2002 FIFA World Cup qualifier against Moldova, again playing alongside Patrik Andersson at centre back.

Personal life 
Matovac was born in Sweden to Croatian parents.

Career statistics

International 

Scores and results list Sweden's goal tally first, score column indicates score after each Matovac goal.

Honours 
Aalborg BK
Danish Superliga: 1999–2000
Sweden
 King's Cup: 1997

References 

Living people
1970 births
Swedish footballers
Sweden international footballers
Swedish expatriate footballers
Association football defenders
Allsvenskan players
Danish Superliga players
Helsingborgs IF players
AaB Fodbold players
Expatriate men's footballers in Denmark
Örgryte IS players
BK Häcken players